Armand Zunder (born 14 April 1946, in Paramaribo) is a Surinamese economist. As chairman of the Committee Reparations Slavery Past he was part of a reparations for slavery effort directed at the Netherlands. In 2020, Zunder became president of the Taxation Office.

References 

Living people
1946 births
Reparations for slavery
Surinamese economists
Surinamese trade unionists
People from Paramaribo